Penthides is a genus of longhorn beetles of the subfamily Lamiinae, containing the following species:

 Penthides anilis Holzschuh, 2010
 Penthides flavus Matsushita, 1933
 Penthides modestus Tippmann, 1955
 Penthides rufoflavus (Hayashi, 1957)

References

Desmiphorini